Ernst Julius Hähnel (9 March 1811, Dresden – 22 May 1891, Dresden) was a German sculptor and Professor at the Dresden Academy of Fine Arts.

He is especially remembered for his public statuary. His works of art can be admired throughout Germany.

Life 
He was born in Dresden on 9 March 1811.

He originally studied architecture at the Dresden Academy then, in 1826, went to the Academy of Fine Arts, Munich, where he remained until 1831 and later switched to sculpture after taking classes with Ernst Rietschel and Ludwig Schwanthaler. He took a study trip to Rome and Florence and returned to Munich, living there from 1835 to 1838, when he was appointed to the Dresden Academy. 

Upon arriving there, Gottfried Semper entrusted him with the preparation of some sculptures for the new Semperoper (Opera House). In 1845, he created the Beethoven Monument in Bonn, the work which made him famous. He became a full Professor at the Dresden Academy in 1848. Johannes Schilling and Christian Behrens were among his best-known students.

In 1859, he received an Honorary Doctorate from the University of Leipzig and, in 1883, became an Honorary citizen of Dresden. 

He died on 22 May 1891 and is buried in the Old Catholic Cemetery in south Dresden. The original grave was removed due to the German practice of requiring ongoing payments by relatives not being paid, but was replaced by a new grave in April 2016.

Selected works 
 1867: Statue of King Frederick Augustus II of Saxony in Dresden
 1874: Equestrian statue of Count Frederick William, Duke of Brunswick-Wolfenbüttel in Braunschweig
 1874: Plaque of Ludwig Tieck at the former location of his home near the Altmarkt in Dresden

Other notable works

Raphael, Albertinum, Dresden

References

Further reading 
 Berndorfer Metallwarenfabrik: Die Monumental-Arbeiten der k.k. Kunst-Erzgiesserei in Wien, Vienna (1901), pg. 21.
 Hähnel, Ernst. In: Ulrich Thieme, Felix Becker et al.: Allgemeines Lexikon der Bildenden Künstler von der Antike bis zur Gegenwart. Vol. 15, E. A. Seemann, Leipzig (1922), pgs.427–428.
 Ilse Krumpöck: Die Bildwerke im Heeresgeschichtlichen Museum, Vienna (2004), pg.65.

External links 

German sculptors
German male sculptors
1811 births
1891 deaths
Academic staff of the Dresden Academy of Fine Arts
19th-century sculptors
Recipients of the Pour le Mérite (civil class)